The lieutenant governor of Arkansas presides over the Arkansas Senate with a tie-breaking vote, serves as acting governor of Arkansas when the governor is out of state and assumes the governorship in cases of impeachment, removal from office, death or inability to discharge the office's duties. The position is elected separately from the Arkansas Governor.

The position of Lieutenant Governor was created by the Sixth Amendment to the Arkansas Constitution in 1914, but was not filled until 1927. The Amendment was approved by the electorate in 1914, with returns showing 45,567 in favor and 45,206 opposed. The Speaker of the House declared the measure lost because it had not received a majority of the highest total vote, which was 135,517. In 1925, it was discovered that the Initiative and Referendum of 1910 had amended this majority requirement so that only a majority of those voting on a specific question was required. So, in 1926, the 1914 initiative was declared to be valid and Harvey Parnell was elected Arkansas' first lieutenant governor.

Two recent incumbents, Winthrop Paul Rockefeller and Mike Huckabee, began their respective tenures in the midst of regular term periods, due to the elevation of their predecessors to the governorship. Jim Guy Tucker succeeded Bill Clinton as governor in December 1992, upon Clinton's resignation days before assuming his office as President of the United States, creating the need for a special election to fill the lieutenant governor's office.  When Tucker was convicted of conspiracy and mail fraud charges in 1996, Huckabee succeeded him as governor, paving the way for the November 1996 special election of Rockefeller as lieutenant governor.

The current lieutenant governor is Leslie Rutledge, since January 10, 2023.

List of officeholders

Notes

References 
General

 

Constitutions

 
 
 
 
 

Specific

Government of Arkansas